East Sacramento (also known as East Sac) is a neighborhood in Sacramento, California, United States, that is east of downtown and midtown. East Sacramento is bounded by U.S. Route 50 to the south, Business Loop 80 to the west and north, Elvas Avenue to the northeast and east, and California State University, Sacramento and the American River to the southeast. East Sacramento residential development began in the 1890s, and the area was annexed into Sacramento in 1911. East Sacramento was also home to the Alhambra Theatre. East Sacramento also includes McKinley Park and the "Fabulous Forties" neighborhood.

McKinley Park
McKinley Park is a major  park located in East Sacramento. The park is bordered to the north by McKinley Boulevard, to the south by H Street, by Alhambra Boulevard to the West and 33rd Street to the East. There is also a smaller, adjacent park located across 33rd Street. A branch of the Sacramento Public Library is located in the north wing of the Clunie Clubhouse, a community center located at the park. The library which serves East Sacramento, Midtown, and River Park has 45,000 volumes. There is also a small lake and 8 tennis courts. The smaller park includes the Shepard Garden and Arts Center. The park is a popular place for runners and walkers.

Quality of life: Greater East Sacramento and McKinley Park are highly sought after neighborhoods due partly to their central freeway location, proximity to the Midtown area and the State Capital corridor. East Sac home prices have seen the largest price appreciations relative to size of any area in Sacramento. Additionally the Midtown factor, an area which has seen an explosion in the number of fine dining offerings, monthly social events and public art and performance offerings, weighs heavily on the popularity of East Sac due in part to its relative ease of access to this area via bike, public transportation or just walking. Schools, community activities, a relative sense of security and the number of outdoor, social and recreational diversions make for a pleasant mix of outdoor offering that encourage and foster a strong sense of community.

Fabulous Forties
The Fab Forties neighborhood is  part of the East Sacramento district. President Ronald Reagan lived at 1341 45th Street while serving most of his term as Governor of California.
The "Fab '40s" is the historic terminus of a once extensive streetcar network that covered nearly all the historic neighborhoods of the city. Forty-sixth street at J Street was the turnaround point for the J Street Line making it one of the widest streets in East Sacramento.  The lots between 38th and 47th Streets and bordered by J Street and Folsom Boulevard are among the largest in East Sacramento, creating the concentration of larger houses that gave rise to the area's name.  Up until the Great Depression, the grand homes of the "Fab '40s" were considered to be the modern-day equivalent of a suburban mansion. Now, they are considered architecturally spectacular large to mid-sized houses in a very pricey location. Additionally, the demand for larger and more modern housing has created an interesting surge in the number of remodels and multi-story additions throughout the McKinley Park and East Sacramento community. The Fab Forties neighborhood is home to a deodar cedar tree (cedrus deodara) that is over 100 years old.

Demographics
East Sacramento is somewhat diverse. The neighborhood is 74% White, 10% Hispanic, 5% Asian, 5% Black, another 6% is Mixed or Other. 

The area is historically a predominantly Irish-American neighborhood in the area near Sacred Heart Parish, and Italian-American in the neighborhood near St. Mary Parish.

Famous residents
 Biba Caggiano - cookbook author and restaurateur
 Kevin Johnson - former mayor of Sacramento 
 Jim Kozimor - announcer for San Jose Earthquakes, former Sacramento Kings announcer
 Lloyd Levine - former assemblymember from Van Nuys and permanent Sacramento resident 
 Carol Liu - California state senator from La Cañada Flintridge
 Robert S. Nelsen - president at Sacramento State University
 Nancy Reagan - wife of former U.S. President and California Governor Ronald Reagan
 Ronald Reagan - former president of the United States, former governor of California, actor
 Michelle Rhee-Johnson - former DC chancellor of schools
 Urijah Faber - Mixed Martial Arts UFC Champion and Hall of Famer

Political representation

 School board trustee: Ellen Cochrane
 Councilmember: Jeff Harris
 County supervisor: Phil Serna
 Assemblymember: 
 State senator: 
 United States representative:

See also
 Alhambra Theatre - a major theater that was located on Alhambra Boulevard until it was razed to build the Safeway store.
 SMUD - The public electric utility that serves all of Sacramento County and a small portion of Placer County makes its headquarters at 6201 S Street. Employs 2300 people.
 St. Francis High School - an all-female Catholic high school with over 1,000 students located on Elvas Avenue.

References

External links
 East Sacramento Chamber of Commerce
 East Sacramento Preservation Neighborhood Association
 McKinley Park 
 St. Francis High School

Neighborhoods in Sacramento, California
Populated places established in the 1890s